José Aílton da Silva (born 8 September 1977), known as just Aílton, is a Brazilian former professional footballer, who operated as an attacking midfielder and also as a left midfielder or winger in the same zone. Product of the youth ranks of Bragantino, he started his professional career in 1996 with Palmeiras. He then moved to Deportivo Italia, after a brief spell at Etti Jundiaí. He is a Mexican naturalized citizen.

Club career

Early career
His playing career started in 1997 at Palmeiras, then in 1998 he moved to Etti Jundiaí-SP. By 1999 he was ready to move on and was signed by Venezuela's Deportivo Italia, helping them to the league title. He was then signed by Mexican club Club Atlas, subsequently being sold to Club Leon in the country's second division. His next move, a brief, unsuccessful spell with A.S. Bari in Italy was ended by Pumas.

UNAM Pumas
In his return to Mexico at Pumas his skills helped the club win the Mexican League titles and, in 2004, Santiago Bernabéu Trophy. In 2006, he helped San Luis to have their best position in the table of Clausura before his subsequent move in 2007 to Brazilian club Sport Club Corinthians Paulista.

Universidad Católica
In 2008, he joined Católica.

O'Higgins

Late career

Honours

Club
Deportivo Italia
 Primera División Venezolana (1): 1999

UNAM Pumas
 Torneo de Clausura (1): 2004
 Torneo de Apertura (1): 2004
 Trofeo Santiago Bernabéu (1): 2004
 Copa Sudamericana (1): Runner–up 2005

References

External links

 Aílton da Silva at Football–Lineups
 
 BDFA Profile

1977 births
Living people
Brazilian emigrants to Mexico
Brazilian footballers
Brazilian expatriate footballers
Naturalized citizens of Mexico
Clube Atlético Bragantino players
Paulista Futebol Clube players
Sociedade Esportiva Palmeiras players
Serie B players
S.S.C. Bari players
Sport Club Corinthians Paulista players
Liga MX players
Atlas F.C. footballers
Club Universidad Nacional footballers
San Luis F.C. players
Club León footballers
C.D. Veracruz footballers
Deportivo Italia players
Club Deportivo Universidad Católica footballers
O'Higgins F.C. footballers
Expatriate footballers in Chile
Expatriate footballers in Venezuela
Clube Atlético Joseense players
Association football midfielders